Helen Moody defeated Helen Jacobs 6–2, 6–1 in the final to win the women's singles tennis title at the 1930 French Championships.

Seeds
The seeded players are listed below. Helen Moody is the champion; others show the round in which they were eliminated.

 Helen Moody (champion)
 Phoebe Holcroft Watson (quarterfinals)
 Simonne Mathieu (quarterfinals)
 Cilly Aussem (semifinals)
 Elizabeth Ryan (quarterfinals)
 Lilí Álvarez (semifinals)
 Helen Jacobs (finalist)
 Eileen Bennett (second round)

Draw

Key
 Q = Qualifier
 WC = Wild card
 LL = Lucky loser
 r = Retired

Finals

Earlier rounds

Section 1

Section 2

Section 3

Section 4

References

External links
   on the French Open website

1930 in tennis
1930
1930 in French women's sport
1930 in French tennis